Lorenza is a given name. Notable people with the name include:

Lorenza Agoncillo (1890–1972), daughter of the principal seamstress of the first and official Philippine flag
Lorenza Alessandrini (born 1990), Italian ice dancer who began representing France internationally in 2015
Lorenza Ramírez de Arellano (1906–1970), the first wife of former Governor of Puerto Rico Luis A. Ferré
Lorenza Arnetoli (born 1974), Italian basketball player
Lorenza Avemanay, indigenous Ecuadorian who led an 1803 revolt against the Spanish occupation in Guamote
María Lorenza Barreneche (1926–2016), Argentine public figure and wife of the late President Raúl Alfonsín
Lorenza Bernot (born 1988), Mexican beauty pageant contestant who competed in the Miss International 2008 pageant
Lorenza Bonaccorsi (born 1968), Italian politician
Lorenza Borrani (born 1983), Italian violinist
Lorenza Cobb (1888–1953), American baseball catcher in the Negro leagues
Lorenza Colzato (born 1974), Italian cognitive psychologist
Lorenza Correa (1773–1831), Spanish stage actress and opera singer
Lorenza Guerrieri (born 1944), Italian actress
Lorenza Haynes (1820–1899), American librarian, minister, school founder, suffragist, and writer
Lorenza Indovina (born 1966), Italian actress
Lorenza Izzo (born 1989), Chilean actress and model
Lorenza Mario (born 1969), Italian dancer, actress and television personality
Lorenza Mazzetti (1927–2020), Italian film director, novelist, photographer and painter
Lorenza Morfín (born 1982), road cyclist from Mexico
Lorenza Ponce, American violinist and string arranger
Lorenza Villegas Restrepo (1899–1960), the wife of the 15th President of Colombia, Eduardo Santos Montejo
Lorenza Vigarani (born 1969), retired Olympic backstroke swimmer from Italy

See also
Euterpia lorenza, a butterfly in the family Pieridae
Lorena (disambiguation)
Lorentzian (disambiguation)
Lorenz
Lorenzana
Lorenzia
Lorenzo (disambiguation)